United Nations Security Council Resolution 353, adopted unanimously on 20 July 1974 was a Resolution in which the Council demanded the immediate withdrawal of all foreign military personnel present in the Republic of Cyprus in contravention of paragraph 1 of the United Nations Charter.  The resolution goes on to call upon Greece, Turkey and the United Kingdom to immediately enter into negotiations to restore peace on the island, and constitution government to its people.

See also
 Cyprus dispute
 Greek–Turkish relations
 History of Cyprus
 List of United Nations Security Council Resolutions 301 to 400 (1971–1976)

References
Text of the Resolution at undocs.org

External links
 

 0353
 0353
 0353
July 1974 events